Demobotys pervulgalis is a moth in the family Crambidae. It was described by George Hampson in 1913. It is found in Japan and China.

Subspecies
Demobotys pervulgalis pervulgalis (Japan)
Demobotys pervulgalis exigua Munroe & Mutuura, 1969 (China: Nanjing)
Demobotys pervulgalis hunana Munroe & Mutuura, 1969 (China: Hunan)

References

Moths described in 1913
Pyraustinae